Michael Ratchford is an American politician. He served as Secretary of State of Delaware in 1992 during the administration of Gov. Michael Castle.

References

Secretaries of State of Delaware
Living people
Year of birth missing (living people)
Place of birth missing (living people)